The 2015–16 FA Cup qualifying rounds opened the 135th season of competition in England for The Football Association Challenge Cup (FA Cup), the world's oldest association football single knockout competition. A total of 736 clubs were accepted for the competition, the same as the previous season.

The large number of clubs entering the tournament from lower down (Levels 5 to 10) in the English football pyramid meant that the competition started with six rounds of preliminary (2) and qualifying (4) knockouts for these non-League teams. The 32 winning teams from the Fourth qualifying round progressed to the First Round Proper, where League teams tiered at Levels 3 and 4 entered the competition.

Calendar and prizes
The calendar for the 2015–16 FA Cup qualifying rounds, as announced by The Football Association.

Extra preliminary round
Extra preliminary round fixtures were due to be played on 15 August 2015, with replays taking place no later than 20 August 2015. A total of 368 teams, from Level 9 and Level 10 of English football, entered at this stage of the competition. The round includes 91 teams from Level 10 of English football, being the lowest ranked clubs to compete in the tournament.

Preliminary round
Preliminary round fixtures were due to be played on 29 August 2015, with replays no later than 4 September. A total of 320 teams took part in this stage of the competition, including the 184 winners from the Extra preliminary round and 136 entering at this stage from the six leagues at Level 8 of English football. The round included 29 teams from Level 10 still in the competition, being the lowest ranked teams in this round.

First qualifying round
First qualifying round fixtures were played on 12 September 2015, with replays no later than 18 September. A total of 232 teams took part in this stage of the competition, including the 160 winners from the Preliminary round and 72 entering at this stage from the three leagues at Level 7 of English football. The round included eleven teams from Level 10 still in the competition, being the lowest ranked teams in this round.

Second qualifying round
Second qualifying round fixtures were due to be played on 26 September 2015, with replays no later than 2 October. A total of 160 teams took part in this stage of the competition, including the 116 winners from the First qualifying round and 44 entering at this stage from the two leagues at Level 6 of English football. The round included Bodmin Town, Hinckley and Hook Norton from Level 10 still in the competition, being the lowest ranked teams in this round.

Third qualifying round
Third qualifying round fixtures were due to be played on 10 October 2015, with replays taking place no later than 16 October. A total of 80 teams took part in this stage of the competition, all winners from the Second qualifying round. The round included eight teams from Level 9 still in the competition, being the lowest ranked teams in this round.

Fourth qualifying round
Fourth qualifying round fixtures were due to be played on 24 October 2015, with replays taking place no later than 30 October. A total of 64 teams took part in this stage of the competition, including the 40 winners from the Third qualifying round and 24 entering at this stage from the Conference Premier at Level 5 of English football. The round included Sporting Khalsa from Level 9 still in the competition, being the lowest ranked team in this round.

Competition proper

Winners from the Fourth qualifying round advanced to the First Round Proper, where teams from League One (Level 3) and League Two (Level 4) of English football, operating in The Football League, first enter the competition. See 2015–16 FA Cup for a report of First Round Proper onwards.

Broadcasting rights
The qualifying rounds aren't covered by the FA Cup's broadcasting contracts held by BBC Sport and BT Sport, although one game was televised.

The following qualifying rounds matches were broadcast live on UK television:

References

External links
 The FA Cup Archive

2015–16 FA Cup
FA Cup qualifying rounds